MCTS may reference:

 Marine Communications and Traffic Services, a radio service operated by the Canadian Coast Guard which provides vessel traffic and marine weather information
 Microsoft Certified Technology Specialist, a professional certification from Microsoft
 Middelburg Center for Transatlantic Studies
 Milwaukee County Transit System 
 Monte Carlo tree search – a heuristic search algorithm based on the Monte Carlo method
 Multiple Console Time Sharing System, a 1970s operating system developed by General Motors Research Laboratory
 Munich Center for Technology in Society, a research center at the Technical University of Munich
 Mercer County Technical Schools, a vocational public school district in Mercer County, New Jersey, United States

See also
 MCT (disambiguation) ; MCTs plural form of MCT